Malik Carney (born September 21, 1995) is a professional gridiron football defensive end for the Hamilton Tiger-Cats of the Canadian Football League (CFL).

College career
After using a redshirt season in 2014, Carney played college football for the North Carolina Tar Heels from 2015 to 2018. He played in 36 games where he had 176 tackles, 32.5 tackles for loss, 17 sacks, five forced fumbles and three fumble recoveries.

Professional career

Detroit Lions
On May 10, 2019, Carney signed with the Detroit Lions after going undrafted in the 2019 NFL Draft. He was released near the end of training camp on August 31, 2019.

Seattle Seahawks
On September 25, 2019, Carney signed a practice roster agreement with the Seattle Seahawks. He was released October 15, 2019, but then re-signed on October 23, 2019. Two days later, he was again released from the practice squad.

Denver Broncos
On November 12, 2019, Carney signed a practice roster agreement with the Denver Broncos. He re-signed with the team to a futures contract on December 31, 2019, but was released at the end of the pre-season on September 5, 2020.

Hamilton Tiger-Cats
On January 18, 2021, Carney signed with the Hamilton Tiger-Cats. After beginning the season on the injured list, he made his professional debut in week 2, on August 14, 2021, against the Saskatchewan Roughriders where he also recorded his first sack after tackling Cody Fajardo. He played in four regular season games, starting in two, where he had three defensive tackles, one special teams tackle, and one sack. He was on the reserve roster for the East Semi-Final, but made his playoff debut in the East Final where he recorded two tackles and a sack in the victory over the Toronto Argonauts. In his first Grey Cup championship game, he recorded one defensive tackle in the 108th Grey Cup loss to the Winnipeg Blue Bombers.

Following 2022 training camp, Carney earned a starting role at defensive end for the season opening game against the Roughriders, where he had four defensive tackles, but was reduced to a backup role thereafter.

Personal life
Carney was born to parents Lamont Carney and Adrienne Williams.

References

External links
 Hamilton Tiger-Cats bio

1995 births
Living people
American football defensive linemen
American players of Canadian football
Canadian football defensive linemen
Denver Broncos players
Detroit Lions players
Hamilton Tiger-Cats players
North Carolina Tar Heels football players
Players of American football from Virginia
Players of Canadian football from Virginia
Sportspeople from Alexandria, Virginia
Seattle Seahawks players